The University of East London Black Bulls are a Gaelic Athletic Association club based in East London, England.  The club was founded in 2007 and is primarily concerned with the game of Gaelic football.

History

The UEL Black Bulls were founded in 2007 following a meeting with the Universities' Sports and Social club.  It was the first Gaelic Football club to represent the University of East London.  Within a month, the new club had made their mark defeating the University of Worcester in Oxford. Unfortunately, the hosts had inflicted the fledgling club's first defeat just hours earlier.

The nickname 'Black Bulls' derives from a local Irish-owned hostelry in the Stratford area of London that provided sponsorship for the club.

See also
British University Gaelic football Championship

External links
www.britishuniversities.he.gaa.ie
UELSports

Gaelic Athletic Association clubs in Britain
Gaelic Athletic Association clubs in London
2007 sports events in London
2007 establishments in England
Sport in the London Borough of Newham
University of East London